Shevin Jamar Smith (June 17, 1975-August 30, 2019) was a former professional American football safety in the National Football League. He played two seasons for the Tampa Bay Buccaneers.

References

External links
Shevin Smith at Tampa Bay Buccaneers

1975 births
Living people
Miami Southridge Senior High School alumni
Players of American football from Miami
American football safeties
Florida State Seminoles football players
Tampa Bay Buccaneers players